Pleasure & Pain is the fifth studio album BY American R&B group 112. It was released by Def Soul on March 29, 2005 in the United States. Named after the song "Pleasure & Pain" on 112's 1996 eponymous debut album, 112, the album did not fare as well as their first three albums, but the album did manage to spawn one hit single in 2005; the single "U Already Know" peaked at #32 on the Billboard Hot 100, while the second single "What If" reached #74.  It was the first 112 album to get a Parental Advisory sticker (although a few songs from earlier releases contain profanity as well). The single, "U Already Know", has two  official remixes, the official Murder Remix featuring Ja Rule & Harry O and the official Roc-A-Fella Remix featuring Foxy Brown.

Critical reception

Andy Kellman of AllMusic found that Pleasure & Pain "isn't much different from the previous albums, with a few standout singles and album tracks surrounded by a generous amount of forgettable moments, and a similar ratio of upbeat numbers and ballads to match."

Commercial performance
Pleasure & Pain debuted at number four on the US Billboard 200 chart, with sales of 118,000 copies its first week of release. This marked the group's second top-ten album on the chart. On July 15, 2005, it was certified gold by the Recording Industry Association of America (RIAA) for sales of over 500,000 copies in the United States.

Track listing

Notes
 denotes co-producer(s)

Sample credits
 "U Already Know" contains a sample of "Can We Fall in Love Again", as performed by Phyllis Hyman.
 "The Way" contains an interpolation of "Change the Game", as performed by Jay-Z featuring Memphis Bleek and Beanie Sigel.
 "That's How Close We Are" contains a sample of "That Sweet Woman of Mine", as performed by Leon Haywood.

Personnel

 112 – vocals (background), executive producer
 L.A. Reid – executive producer
 Shakir Stewart – executive producer
 Marcus T. Grant – executive producer
 Daron Jones – producer
 Bryan-Michael Cox – producer
 The Track Boyz – producer
 Jermaine Dupri – producer, mixing
 Kevin Wales – producer
 Mario Winans – producer
 Ken Fambro – producer
 Sean Garrett – producer, vocal producer
 Focus... – producer
 Michael Keith – vocal producer
 Quinnes Parker – vocal producer
 Clifford Henson – vocal engineer
 Paul Osborn – vocal engineer
 Roxanne Estrada – vocals (background)
 Jeanne Allamby – production coordination
 Darrell "Delite" Allamby – producer, engineer, editing, mixing, tracking, vocal engineer, instrumentation
 Bam – producer, instrumentation
 Butch Bonner – guitar
 Floyd "Tag" Merriweather – guitar
 Vernon Mungo – engineer, mixing
 Alvin Speights – mixing
 Bruce Buechner – engineer
 Eric Hunter – engineer
 Tommy Jamin – engineer
 Brian Frye – engineer
 Manny Marroquin – mixing
 Phil Tan – mixing
 Ben Arrindell – mixing
 Jim Beeman – mixing
 Jean-Marie Horvat – mixing
 Ryan Evans – assistant engineer, assistant
 James M. Wisner – assistant engineer
 Josh Monroy – assistant engineer
 John Horesco IV – assistant
 Khary Menelik – assistant
 James Mungo – assistant
 Rob Skipworth – assistant
 Erica Bowen – recording director
 Sandra Campbell – project coordinator
 Warryn Campbell – programming, producer, instrumentation
 Sean Cooper – sound design
 Tom Coyne – mastering
 Nichell Delvaille – art producer
 Roger Erickson – photography
 Sybil Pennix – wardrobe
 Robert Sims – design, creative director
 Eric Weissman – sample clearance
 Matthew Betmalik – prop stylist

Charts

Weekly charts

Year-end charts

Certifications

Release history

References

2005 albums
112 (band) albums
Albums produced by Focus...
Albums produced by Jermaine Dupri
Albums produced by Warryn Campbell
Def Jam Recordings albums